Antony and Cleopatra (Italian: Marcantonio e Cleopatra) is a 1913 Italian silent historical film directed by Enrico Guazzoni, starring Gianna Terribili-Gonzales, Amleto Novelli and Ignazio Lupi. The film is an adaptation of William Shakespeare's play of the same title, with inspiration also drawn from a poem by Pietro Cossa.

The film was released in the U.S. as Mark Antony and Cleopatra, and in Germany as Die Herrin des Nils. The film still exists today.

Cast
 Gianna Terribili-Gonzales as Cleopatra  
 Amleto Novelli as Marcantonio  
 Ignazio Lupi as Augustus Caesar Ottaviano  
 Elsa Lenard as Ottavia  
 Matilde Di Marzio as La schiava Agar aka Charmian 
 Ruffo Geri as Il capo dei congiurati  
 Ida Carloni Talli as La strega  
 Bruto Castellani    
 Giuseppe Piemontesi

References

Sources
Hatchuel, Sarah & Vienne-Guerrin, Nathalie. Shakespeare on Screen: The Roman Plays. Publication Univ Rouen Havre, 2009.

External links

1910s historical drama films
1913 films
Films based on Antony and Cleopatra
Films directed by Enrico Guazzoni
Films set in ancient Rome
Italian historical drama films
Italian silent feature films
1910s Italian-language films
Italian black-and-white films
Depictions of Augustus on film
1913 drama films
Silent historical drama films
Silent war films
Italian epic films